Cedar Creek Golf Course at Beavers Bend (also known simply as Cedar Creek) is a public golf course on the shores of Broken Bow Lake, about nine miles north of the city of Broken Bow, Oklahoma. The course has eighteen holes with a par of 72, and offers champion Bermuda grass greens, Bermuda grass tees and fairways, putting green, driving range, and a pro shop with cart and club rentals, snacks and drinks.

Praise
Cedar Creek Golf Course at Beavers Bend was rated four stars by Golf Digest Magazine as "Places to Play 2002."

References

External links
Cedar Creek Golf Course at Beavers Bend
Beavers Bend Golf Information

Golf clubs and courses in Oklahoma
Buildings and structures in McCurtain County, Oklahoma
Tourist attractions in McCurtain County, Oklahoma